Lieutenant General Rajshree Ramasethu is a former general officer of the Indian Army. She is the fifth woman in the Indian Armed Forces and third in the Indian Army to be promoted to a Three-star rank. She last served as the Director and Commandant of the Armed Forces Medical College, Pune.

Early life and education
Ramasethu joined the Armed Forces Medical College, Pune in 1979.

Military career
Ramasethu was commissioned in the Army Medical Corps in December 1983. She did her post-graduation, earning the Doctor of Medicine degree in Internal Medicine. She subsequently underwent super specialisation in Nephrology at the All India Institute of Medical Sciences, New Delhi.

Ramasethu has tenanted appointments of Consultant (medicine and Nephrology) at INHS Asvini, the naval hospital in Mumbai, and the Command Hospital Eastern Command in Kolkata. She has also served as the Commandant of the Military Hospital, Chennai and as the Assistant Chief of the Integrated Defence Staff (Medical) (ACIDS Med) at HQ IDS.

As a Major General, Ramasethu served as the Senior Consultant (Medicine) in the office of the Director General Armed Forces Medical Services (DGAFMS) in New Delhi. She then served as Major General Medical at the Southern Command at Pune. On 16 September 2021, Ramasethu assumed the office of Director and Commandant of her alma-mater Armed Forces Medical College, Pune in the rank of  Lieutenant General.

Awards and decorations
Ramasethu has been awarded the Chief of the Army Staff Commendation Card three times - in 1995, 2011 and 2017.

See also
 Women in the Indian Armed Forces
 Punita Arora
 Padma Bandopadhyay
 Madhuri Kanitkar
 Sheila S. Mathai
 Arti Sarin

References

Indian Army personnel
Female generals of the Indian Army
Female army generals
Living people
Women in 21st-century warfare
Women in warfare post-1945
Indian female military personnel
Year of birth missing (living people)